Pulp and Paper was the largest United States-based trade magazine for the pulp and paper industry. It was owned by RISI and based in Boston. The magazine existed between 1998 and 2015. In 2016 it merged with Paper360° Magazine, owned by the Technical Association of the Pulp and Paper Industry (TAPPI).

See also
 Paper engineering

References

External links
 Official website

Business magazines published in the United States
Defunct magazines published in the United States
Magazines established in 1998
Magazines disestablished in 2015
Magazines published in Boston
Packaging magazines and journals
Professional and trade magazines
Pulp and paper industry